The 2021–22 Hampton Pirates men's basketball team represented Hampton University in the 2021–22 NCAA Division I men's basketball season. The Pirates, led by 13th-year head coach Edward Joyner, Jr., played their home games at the Hampton Convocation Center in Hampton, Virginia as members of the Big South Conference. They finished the season 9–19, 5–11 in Big South play to finish in last place in the North division. As the No. 10 seed in the Big South tournament, they lost to High Point in the first round.

The season marked the school's last season as a member of the Big South as the Pirates will join the Colonial Athletic Association in 2022.

Previous season
In a season limited due to the ongoing COVID-19 pandemic, the Pirates finished the 2020–21 season 11–14, 9–9 in Big South play to finish in seventh place. They lost to Radford in the quarterfinals of the Big South tournament.

Roster

Schedule and results 

|-
!colspan=12 style=| Non-conference regular season

|-
!colspan=12 style=| Big South Conference regular season

|-
!colspan=12 style=| Big South tournament
|-

|-

Source

References

Hampton Pirates men's basketball seasons
Hampton Pirates
Hampton Pirates men's basketball
Hampton Pirates men's basketball